Tetrastes is a genus of birds in the grouse subfamily. It contains the following species:

Both species live in forests with at least some conifers in cool regions of the Northern Hemisphere.

References

 
Bird genera
Taxa named by Alexander von Keyserling
Taxa named by Johann Heinrich Blasius